SDM College of Medical Sciences  is situated at Manjusreenagar in Dharwad, Karnataka, India. The college is located near to Navalur railway station in between Hubli and Dharwad. The school offers educational courses in medicine and surgery leading to MBBS degree. The college is run by SDM Educational Society, Ujire. The college was established in the year 2003.The college has a well equipped hospital attached to it.

Gallery

See also 

S.D.M College of Engineering and Technology
SDM College of Dental Sciences

External links 
Official Website of SDM Medical College

Medical colleges in Karnataka
Universities and colleges in Hubli-Dharwad
Universities and colleges in Dharwad
Medical colleges in Dharwad
Hospitals in Dharwad
Educational institutions established in 2003
2003 establishments in Karnataka